7 Deadly Zens is a solo studio album by Styx guitarist/vocalist Tommy Shaw. It was released in 1998 by CMC International Records. The album is in a hard rock style.

Track listing

Personnel 
 Tommy Shaw: all guitars, mandolins, baritone guitars 
 Ted Nugent: lead guitar on tracks 1 & 12 
 Jeffery "C.J." Vanston: Hammond B-3, Wurlitzer & Fender-Rhodes electric pianos on tracks 2, 3, 8 & 10 
 Kirk Helle: extremely noisy guitars & things on tracks 1, 2, 3, 7, 10 & 11; string arrangements 
 Jack Blades: bass guitar 
 John Pierce: bass guitar 
 Marco Mendoza: bass guitar 
 Todd Sucherman: drums 
 Michael Cartellone: additional drums 
 Umfante': all percussion; all background vocals except on track 10 
 Maxine, Julia & Oren Waters: background vocals on track 10 
 Jerry Goodman: terrifying violin solo on track 2 
 The 7 Deadly Zens Quartet: David Lowe, Jerry Goodman, Vivian, Oscar: strings 
 Murmuring Tommyncale Choir: choral group 
 Kevin Cronin: duet vocal on track 7 
 Alison Krauss: duet vocal on track 6 
 Ed Roland: middle eight vocal on track 1 
 Asfoon Kia: castanets on track 11 
 Keith Marks: additional engineering (guitar solos & keyboards) 
 Ted Nugent, Marina Sirtis, Angie Dickinson, Umfante': spoken words

Enhanced CD 
Enhanced CD features include:
 QuickTime videos on the making of the album, with studio footage and clips with Kevin Cronin, Alison Kraus and Ted Nugent
 photos
 song lyrics
 web links

References

1998 albums
Tommy Shaw albums
Albums produced by Eddie Ashworth
CMC International albums